This is a list of books about the Korean War.

Campaigns and battles

 Russ, Martin. Breakout: The Chosin Reservoir Campaign, Korea 1950, Penguin, 2000, 464 pages,

Combat studies

Air combat

 Hallion, Richard P. The Naval Air War in Korea (1986).

 Warrell, Kenneth P. "Across the Yalu: Rules of Engagement and the Communist Air Sanctuary during the Korean War." Journal of Military History 72.2 (2008): 451–76. Print.

Ground combat

 Flanagan, E.M. Jr., Airborne – A Combat History Of American Airborne Forces, The Random House Publishing Group, 2002
 Kindsvatter, Peter S. American Soldiers: Ground Combat in the World Wars, Korea, and Vietnam. U. Press of Kansas, 2003. 472 pp.

 part 2

Intelligence gathering

Logistics

Naval combat

Psychological warfare

Strategy

 Ohn, Chang-Il. "The Korean War of 1950–1953: U.S. Joint Chiefs of Staff and U.S. Strategy." Revue Internationale D'histoire Militaire 70 (1988): 211–41. Print.

Unit cohesion

Cultural impact

Encyclopedia and reference work
 Brune, Lester and Robin Higham, eds., The Korean War: Handbook of the Literature and Research (Greenwood Press, 1994)

 Edwards, Paul M. The A to Z of the Korean War. The Scarecrow Press, 2005. 307 pp.
 Edwards, Paul M. The Hill Wars of the Korean Conflict : A Dictionary of Hills, Outposts and other Sites of Military Action. McFarland & Co., 2006. 267 pp.
 Edwards, Paul M. The Korean War: a Historical Dictionary. The Scarecrow Press, 2003. 367 pp.
 Edwards, Paul M.  Korean War Almanac (2006)

 Matray, James I. (ed.) Historical Dictionary of the Korean War. Greenwood Press, 1991. 626 pp.

 Millett, Allan R, "A Reader's Guide To The Korean War" Journal of Military History (1997) Vol. 61 No. 3; p. 583+ full text in JSTOR; free online revised version
 Millett, Allan R. "The Korean War: A 50 Year Critical Historiography," Journal of Strategic Studies 24 (March 2001), pp. 188–224. full text in Ingenta and Ebsco

 Sandler, Stanley ed., The Korean War: An Encyclopedia (Garland, 1995)
 Summers, Harry G. Korean War Almanac (1990)

Leaders

 
 James, D. Clayton The Years of MacArthur: Triumph and Disaster, 1945–1964 (1985), scholarly biography of MacArthur
 James, D. Clayton with Anne Sharp Wells, Refighting the Last War: Command and Crises in Korea, 1950–1953 (1993)
 Leitich, Keith. Shapers of the Great Debate on the Korean War: A Biographical Dictionary (2006) covers Americans only

Official history

British Commonwealth

 O'Neil, Robert, Australia in the Korean War 1950–53 (2 vols). Australian War Memorial and the Australian Government Publishing Service, 1981 and 1985.

China

India

North Korea

South Korea

United States

 Field Jr., James A. History of United States Naval Operations: Korea, University Press of the Pacific, 2001, . official US Navy history
 Futrell, Robert F. The United States Air Force in Korea, 1950–1953, rev. ed. (Office of the Chief of Air Force History, 1983), official US Air Force history

 Montross, Lynn et al., History of US Marine Operations in Korea, 1950–1953, 5 vols. (Washington: Historical Branch, G-3, Headquarters, Marine Corps, 1954–72)

Oral history, recollections and memoirs 

 Bin Yu and Xiaobing Li, eds. Mao's Generals Remember Korea, University Press of Kansas, 2001, hardcover 328 pp. 

 Matthew B. Ridgway, The Korean War (1967).
 Millett, Allan R. Their War for Korea: American, Asian, and European Combatants and Civilians, 1945–1953. Brassey's, 2003. 310 pp.
 Toland, John. In Mortal Combat: Korea, 1950–1953 (1991)

 Watson, Brent Byron. Far Eastern Tour: The Canadian Infantry in Korea, 1950–1953. 2002. 256 pp.

Origins, politics, diplomacy 
 
 
 Carpenter, William M. "The Korean War: A Strategic Perspective Thirty Years Later." Comparative Strategy 2.4 (1980): 335–53. Print.
 Casey, Steven. Selling the Korean War: Propaganda, Politics, and Public Opinion in the United States, 1950–1953. Oxford: Oxford UP, 2008. Print.
 
 
 
 Foot, Rosemary, "Making Known the Unknown War: Policy Analysis of the Korean Conflict in the Last Decade," Diplomatic History 15 (Summer 1991): 411–31, in JSTOR
 Foot, Rosemary. The Wrong War: American Policy and the Dimensions of the Korean Conflict, 1950–1953. Ithaca: Cornell UP, 1985. Print.

 Goncharov, Sergei N., John W. Lewis; and Xue Litai, Uncertain Partners: Stalin, Mao, and the Korean War, Stanford University Press, 1993, diplomatic
 Kaufman, Burton I. The Korean War: Challenges in Crisis, Credibility, and Command. Temple University Press, 1986, focus is on Washington
 Kaufman, Burton I. The Korean Conflict (Greenwood Press, 1999).
 
 Matray, James. "Truman's Plan for Victory: National Self Determination and the Thirty-Eighth Parallel Decision in Korea," Journal of American History 66 (September, 1979), 314–33. in JSTOR
 Millett, Allan R. The War for Korea, 1945–1950: A House Burning vol 1 (2005) , origins
 Oliver, Robert T. Why War Came in Korea. New York: Fordham UP, 1950. Print.
 Spanier, John W. The Truman-MacArthur Controversy and the Korean War (1959).
 Stueck, William. Rethinking the Korean War: A New Diplomatic and Strategic History. Princeton U. Press, 2002. 285 pp.
 Stueck, Jr., William J. The Korean War: An International History (Princeton University Press, 1995), diplomatic

Overview

General

 

 
 
 British perspective

 Hickey, Michael, The Korean War: The West Confronts Communism, 1950–1953 (London: John Murray, 1999)  

 

 O'Ballance, Edgar. Korea: 1950–1953. Hamden: Archon, 1969. Print.
 Shaara, Jeff (2017), The Frozen Hours: A Novel of the Korean War. New York:  Ballantine Books.  .

British Commonwealth

Belgium

China

Ethiopia

India

South Korea

United States

Turkey

Prisoners of war
 Bassett, Richard M. And the Wind Blew Cold: The Story of an American POW in North Korea. Kent State U. Press, 2002. 117 pp.

Unit history

 

 01
Books
Korean War